Orodontidae is an extinct family of cartilaginous fish that lived from the late Pennsylvanian to the Early Permian in what is now North America.

References

 The Paleobiology Database
 Mikko's Phylogeny Archive

Prehistoric cartilaginous fish families
Carboniferous cartilaginous fish
Permian cartilaginous fish
Carboniferous first appearances
Permian first appearances